The West Branch Little Black River (French: Ruisseau à l'Eau Claire) is a short river in Quebec and northern Maine.

Geography 

The river runs east and southeast, roughly along the border between Témiscouata and Kamouraska RCM, to the Canada–United States border in Maine Township 19, Range 12, WELS.

The upper part of the "West Branch Little Black River" begins in Notre Dame Mountains at the confluence of the "Branche Ouest du Ruisseau à l'Eau Claire" (West Branch Clearwater Brook) and "Petit ruisseau à l'Eau Claire" (Little Clearwater brook), in the municipality of Saint-Athanase, Quebec, in Témiscouata Regional County Municipality (RCM), in Bas-Saint-Laurent administrative region, in Quebec.

This confluence of these two streams is located at:

 at North-East of the limit of the RCM Kamouraska Regional County Municipality (unorganized territory of Picard;
 at Northwest of the border between Quebec and Maine;
 at Northeast of the confluence of the "West Branch Little Black River".

Course of Ruisseau à l'Eau Claire (Clearwater brook) (segment of  flowing in Quebec)

The segment of this river in Canadian territory is named "Ruisseau à l'Eau Claire" (Clearwater brook) and runs as follows:

 Southward to the boundary of the unorganized territory of Picard;
 to the Southeast in the unorganized territory of Picard, to a stream (from the southwest);
 to the Southeast, to the boundary of the municipality of Saint-Athanase, Quebec;
 to the Southeast in Saint-Athanase, Quebec to the limit of the unorganized territory of Picard;
 to the Southeast in the unorganized territory of Picard, to the border between Quebec and Maine.

From the border between Quebec and Maine, the "West Branch Little Black River" flows as follows:

 to the Southeast, up to the confluence of the river.

The "Branch West Little Black River" flows into a river bend on the West bank of the Little Black River (Saint John River) which flows Southeast up to the North shore of Saint John River.

Toponymy 

The toponym "Ruisseau à l'Eau Claire" (English: Clearwater brook) was officialized on December 5, 1968, at Commission de toponymie du Québec (Québec Names Place Board).

The toponym "West Branch Little Black River" was officialized on September 30, 1980, at Geographic Names Information System (GNIS) of United States.

See also
Saint-Athanase, Quebec, a municipality of Quebec
Picard, Quebec, an unorganized territory of Quebec
Kamouraska Regional County Municipality
Temiscouata Regional County Municipality
Aroostook County, Maine
Little Black River (Saint John River)
Saint John River (Bay of Fundy)
List of rivers of Quebec
List of rivers of Maine

References

Maine Streamflow Data from the USGS
Maine Watershed Data From Environmental Protection Agency

External links 

Rivers of Bas-Saint-Laurent
Tributaries of the Saint John River (Bay of Fundy)
Rivers of Aroostook County, Maine
North Maine Woods
International rivers of North America